Cimola is a monotypic moth genus in the subfamily Lymantriinae. Its only species, Cimola opalina, is found in South Africa. Both the genus and the species were first described by Francis Walker in 1855.

References

Lymantriinae
Monotypic moth genera